Cambodia, which is represented by the National Olympic Committee of Cambodia (NOCC), competed at the 2012 Summer Olympics in London from 27 July to 12 August 2012. Six Cambodian athletes competed in the disciplines of track and field athletics, swimming, taekwondo, and judo.

Background
Since their first appearance in equestrian at the 1956 Summer Olympics, Cambodia has sent 37 participants to seven editions of the Summer Olympic Games, making 2012 their fifth consecutive Games and eighth overall. Athletes from Cambodia have competed in seven distinct sports since 1956, although since 2000 their delegation has consisted of only track and field athletes and swimmers. The nation has never participated in the Winter Olympics nor has it ever won a medal.

Four Cambodian athletes received special scholarships from the International Olympic Committee (IOC) to help them qualify for the 2012 Summer Olympics: Chov Sotheara, who won wrestling gold at the 2009 Southeast Asian Games, Sorn Davin, a silver medalist in taekwondo at the 2011 Southeast Asian Games, Phal Sophat, who captured a silver medal in boxing at the 2009 Southeast Asian Games, and athlete Sar Choub Veasna. Both Davin and Sotheara failed to qualify through normal means and thus required a wild card bid from the IOC. Cambodia received a wild card for taekwondo in April 2012, which was given to Davin. The National Olympic Committee of Cambodia (NOCC) also nominated Ratanakmony Khom, a silver medalist in judo at the 2011 Southeast Asian Games, and athlete Kheang Samon for wild card spots. Ratnakmony received his invitation to attend the Games in June 2012.

Athletics

In March 2012 the NOCC announced that Japanese comedian Neko Hiroshi had been nominated to represent Cambodia in the marathon at the 2012 Olympics, having been chosen for a "special exemption" after no Cambodian athletes met the qualifying standard. Hiroshi, a naturalized Cambodian citizen since 2011, had participated in half-marathons held in Cambodia for over a year and reached the podium at least twice, earning him a national fan base. He received criticism from, among others, Japanese double Olympic marathon medalist Yuko Arimori, whose charity helps develop and train Cambodian athletes in addition to funding their journeys to international competitions. Opponents of Hiroshi's selection for the Olympic Games claim that there are Cambodian-born athletes more deserving of the special exemption, such as Hem Bunting who has won two long-distance medals at the Southeast Asian Games since 2007. The International Association of Athletics Federations rejected his nomination, however, on the grounds that Hiroshi was ineligible to compete internationally until October 2012, as individuals with new nationalities must wait one year from the date of their citizenship before they can represent the nation on the world stage. They also refused to wave this requirement for Hiroshi, deciding that it was not a circumstance that warranted such an action.

Chan Seyha, who competed in the 200 metre event at the 2011 World Championships in Athletics, ran in the same distance at the 2012 Olympics and Samorn Kieng participated in the men's 800m event.

Men

Women

Judo

Ratanakmony Khom, a silver medalist at the 2011 Southeast Asian Games in the men's 50–55 kg judo competition, represented Cambodia in the men's 60 kg event at the 2012 Summer Olympics.

Swimming

Hemthon Vitiny, who competed in the women's 50 metre freestyle event at the 2008 Summer Olympics participated in the same event at the 2012 Games. Cambodia had one more guaranteed spot for a swimmer in their delegation, which was taken by Ponloeu Hemthon, who competed in the men's 50 metre freestyle.

Men

Women

Taekwondo

Cambodia was given a wild card entrant for taekwondo, allowing Sorn Davin, a silver medalist in taekwondo at the 2011 Southeast Asian Games, to participate.

See also
 Cambodia at the 2012 Summer Paralympics

References

Nations at the 2012 Summer Olympics
2012
Olympics